was a member of the armed militant group the Japanese Red Army (JRA).

He attended Keio University, but dropped out in 1970. Later he worked for a time as an assistant for Kōji Wakamatsu's Wakamatsu Productions, a producer of leftist movies.

Attacks

French Embassy attack
Haruo Wakō and two other members of the JRA (Junzo Okudaira and Jun Nishikawa) were directly involved in the seizure of the French Embassy in The Hague in 1974. The ambassador and ten other people were taken hostage. After lengthy negotiations, the hostages were freed in exchange for the release of the jailed JRA member Yatsuka Furuya, $300,000 and the use of a Boeing 707 airplane, which flew the hostage-takers to Syria. Syria did not consider hostage taking for money revolutionary, and forced them to give up their ransom which was passed on to the French embassy.

AIA building attack

In August 1975, Wakō and other members of the JRA seized the American Insurance Associates (AIA) building which housed several embassies, including the US Embassy in Kuala Lumpur, Malaysia, taking over 50 hostages. Both seizures resulted in the successful demand for release of six fellow members (including Jun Nishikawa) of the JRA from imprisonment in Japan and a flight to Libya. The hostages included the United States consul Robert Stebbins and the Swedish chargé d'affaires Fredrik Bergenstråhle and his secretary.

Prison
In May 1997, Wakō was imprisoned with five other suspected JRA members in Lebanon on charges of forgery before four of them were deported to Jordan in March 2000, the fifth, Kozo Okamoto, was granted asylum for health reasons. As the Jordanian authorities refused to allow Wakō into Jordan. Wakō and the three other suspected JRA members were handed over to Japan to be tried on terrorism charges.

On 23 March 2005 a Japanese court, presided over by Judge Kunihiko Koma, sentenced Haruo Wakō to life in prison. The court dismissed prosecutors' arguments over the conspiracy charge.

References

1949 births
Living people
Japanese people imprisoned abroad
Japanese Red Army
Prisoners and detainees of Lebanon
People extradited from Jordan
People extradited to Japan
Japanese prisoners sentenced to life imprisonment
Prisoners sentenced to life imprisonment by Japan
Japanese communists
People from Shiogama, Miyagi